Boot Rock is a rock,  high, which lies  off the southeast side of Candlemas Island in the South Sandwich Islands. It was charted and named by Discovery Investigations personnel on the Discovery II in 1930.

References 

Rock formations of South Georgia and the South Sandwich Islands